Richard Otto Lange (born September 1, 1948) is a retired professional baseball pitcher who spent four seasons in Major League Baseball (MLB) with the California Angels from 1972 to 1975.

Career
Lange graduated from Bullock Creek High School in Midland, MI. He attended Central Michigan University (CMU) where he was a three-year letterman with the Chippewas baseball team in 1968, 1969 and 1970. He was inducted into the CMU Athletics Hall of Fame in 1987.

He was selected by the California Angels in the 7th round (154th overall) of the 1970 MLB June Amateur Draft. He played his whole career (7 seasons) for minor and Major League Baseball teams for the California Angels.

Lange is featured in A Bitter Cup of Coffee: How MLB and the Players Association Threw 874 Retirees a Curve, a 2010 book written by Douglas J. Gladstone about the plight of 874 retired ballplayers whose major-league careers ended between 1947 and 1979 who were denied pensions because of the Major League Baseball Players Association's failure to retroactively included them as beneficiaries in the amended vesting requirements in the collective agreement that resolved the 1980 MLB strike. His three full years in the majors was one shy of qualifying for the pension requirement during his time as an active player. He was not able to earn that needed additional full year because the Angels denied him the opportunity to be selected in the 1976 MLB expansion draft by removing him from its 40-man roster and a rotator cuff tear to his throwing arm in 1977.

References

External links

Baseball Reference (Minors)
Baseball Gauge
Retrosheet
Venezuelan Professional Baseball League

1948 births
Living people
Baseball players from Michigan
California Angels players
Central Michigan Chippewas baseball players
Central Michigan University alumni
Idaho Falls Angels players
Leones del Caracas players
American expatriate baseball players in Venezuela
Major League Baseball pitchers
People from Harbor Beach, Michigan
Salt Lake City Angels players
Salt Lake City Gulls players
Shreveport Captains players